Major General William Luther Sibert (October 12, 1860 – October 16, 1935) was a senior United States Army officer who commanded the 1st Division on the Western Front during World War I.

Early life and education 
Sibert was born in Gadsden, Alabama, on October 12, 1860. After attending the University of Alabama from 1879 to 1880, he entered the United States Military Academy and was appointed a second lieutenant of Engineers, United States Army, on June 15, 1884. His appointment was a distinction as only the top 10 percent of each West Point class was then commissioned into the Engineers.

Military career 
He graduated from the Engineer School of Applications in 1887 and went on to hold several Engineer positions in the United States and overseas.

In 1899, he was assigned as the Chief Engineer of the 8th Army Corps and the Chief Engineer and General Manager of the Manila and Dagupan Railroad during the Philippine Insurrection. Later, he returned to the United States where he was in charge of river and harbor districts and headquarters in Louisville and Pittsburgh.

From 1907 through 1914, Sibert was a member of the Panama Canal Commission and was responsible for the building of a number of critical parts of the Panama Canal, including the Gatun Locks and Dam, the West Breakwater in Colon, and the channel from Gatun Lake to the Pacific Ocean.

On March 15, 1915, Sibert, by now a lieutenant colonel, was promoted to the rank of brigadier general. This promotion, while not an uncommon practice in the Regular Army of the time, was still unusual. Congress wanted to make Sibert a brigadier general, but the Engineer Corps was only authorized one, so instead of expanding the Corps, they appointed Sibert to a line officer slot (i.e., Infantry). The Army not knowing what to do with an engineer who had never led troops or trained for combat suddenly elevated to a general of infantry, decided to assign Sibert, who had been working on canal projects in the Mid-West and advisory missions to China, to command the Pacific Coast’s Coastal Artillery. Here, it was felt he could do little harm.

Unfortunately for Sibert, when the United States entered World War I in April 1917, Brigadier General Sibert was one of the only senior infantry officers on active duty. He was duly breveted to major general and deployed with the initial four regiments of the American Expeditionary Forces (AEF) which formed the 1st Division (nicknamed "The Big Red One") once in France. The AEF's Commander-in-Chief (C-in-C), General John J. Pershing, a long serving cavalry officer famous for his exploits at San Juan Hill in the Spanish–American War, and recently in charge of the campaign against Pancho Villa, was short on qualified general officers (he himself had only recently been promoted to his position) so Sibert was placed in charge of the 1st Division.

To his credit, Sibert opposed his own promotion as a line officer, protesting his own lack of experience. In the peacetime Army prior to 1917, though, it was relatively harmless. In the cauldron of the Western Front, it was a serious problem. The AEF suffered a serious leadership problem throughout the final year of the war, as officers were rapidly promoted to positions with little or no experience. The American Army was singularly unprepared for the war, and the strain of its rapid expansion created many personnel problems like Sibert's.

Part of the problem was the Army's promotion system, which continued to cause problems into World War II. The rank a Regular Army officer might hold, and their official rank were not always the same. Thus a "peacetime rank" and a "wartime" rank differed. An officer might start the war as a lieutenant colonel, end the war as a major general, and then revert to being a lieutenant colonel after the war. Incidentally, pay was not necessarily tied to rank, but depended on time in service and an individuals official rank. In the small Regular Army of 1917, most officers were below the rank of colonel, and few serving in general officer billets actually were recognized by Congress as holding the rank of general, rather, they were "breveted" to the higher rank. Actual promotion required Congressional approval, the number of positions limited by law, and was based solely on seniority. Breveting allowed the Army to bypass these restrictions, for better or worse. Thus, the problem of promoting Sibert to brigadier general in the Engineer Corps and the subsequent trouble it caused.

Sibert led the 1st Infantry Division during its initial training by French and British forces. In October 1917, Pershing wrote an extensive letter to Secretary of War Newton D. Baker expressing his concerns about some of his generals, "I hope you will permit me to speak very frankly and quite confidentially, but I fear that we have some general officers who have neither the experience, the energy, nor the aggressive spirit to prepare their units or to handle them under battle conditions, as they exist today. I shall comment in an enclosure on the individuals to whom I refer particularly."

In January 1918, the first elements of the AEF, part of the 1st Infantry Division, prepared to deploy into the line at Ansauville. MG Sibert was relieved by General John J. Pershing before the Division's deployment to the front. Pershing was dissatisfied with the Division's progress and elevated Brigadier General Robert Lee Bullard, a true line officer, to replace Sibert. Sibert returned to the United States in January 1918 where he became the commanding general of the Army Corps of Engineers Southeastern Department located at Charleston, South Carolina. Sibert was not alone in his relief, as Secretary Baker had approved Pershing's relief of a number of individuals. Pershing showed some measure of respect for Sibert, who was pushing 58 years old (a contributing factor to his relief), recognizing that the position Sibert was in, was not entirely of his own making. Pershing was not nearly as kind to others he removed from command during the war.

When the War Department created the Chemical Warfare Service (CWS) later that spring, Pershing was asked to name a general officer to head it. Pershing recommended Sibert to the War Department, demonstrating his understanding of Sibert's true ability as an engineer and project manager. Following his assignment to the CWS on June 28, 1918, Congress promoted Sibert to the rank of Major General, making the earlier brevet promotion official. Sibert led the CWS from May 1918 to February 1920. During that period the CWS in the United States focused on production and equipment. As commander of the CWS he oversaw the production of America's first chemical warfare agent, Lewisite, and the development of the US Army's chemical defense equipment, including the first US protective (or "gas") masks, the M-1 and M-2. The CWS in Europe, part of the AEF, did not fall under Sibert's control. Instead, that was led by Colonel Amos Fries, part of Pershing's Command Staff. When Sibert announced his retirement in 1919, Amos Fries, still in Europe, was selected to replace him. Today the US Army considers Sibert the "father of the US Army Chemical Corps" because he was the first commander of the CWS. Of course, he was also the first commanding officer of the 1st Infantry Division, the oldest continually serving Division in the United States Army.

Sibert retired from active duty in February 1920 and settled in Bowling Green, Kentucky. Following his retirement from the Army, Sibert led the modernization of the docks and waterways in Mobile, Alabama and served on the Presidential Commission that led to the building of Hoover Dam. He was elected to the University of Alabama Engineering Hall of Fame in 1961.

For his services during World War I he was awarded the Army Distinguished Service Medal, the citation for which reads:

Personal life 
Sibert married Mary Margaret Cummings in September 1887, with whom he had five sons and one daughter. After Mary's death in 1915, General Sibert married Juliette Roberts in June 1917. She died 15 months later and in 1922 Sibert married Evelyn Clyne Bairnsfather of Edinburgh, Scotland who remained his wife until his death on October 16, 1935 in Bowling Green. General Sibert is buried at Arlington National Cemetery. Two of his five sons, Edwin L. Sibert and Franklin C. Sibert, each retired as Major Generals in the Army.

Decorations

References

External links

William Luther Sibert in the Alabama Hall of Fame
US Army Chemical Corps Regimental Association Biography of MG William L. Sibert

1860 births
1935 deaths
People from Gadsden, Alabama
Chemical warfare
United States Army Corps of Engineers personnel
Burials at Arlington National Cemetery
United States Military Academy alumni
United States Army generals of World War I
United States Army generals
American military personnel of the Spanish–American War
American military personnel of the Philippine–American War
Recipients of the Distinguished Service Medal (US Army)
Recipients of the Legion of Honour
Commandeurs of the Légion d'honneur
Military personnel from Alabama